The 1984–85 Oregon State Beavers men's basketball team represented the Oregon State University as a member of the Pacific 10 Conference during the 1984–85 NCAA Division I men's basketball season. They were led by 15th-year head coach Ralph Miller and played their home games on campus at Gill Coliseum in Corvallis, Oregon.

After opening the season at 15–1 and peaking at No. 10 in the AP poll, Oregon State finished the regular season at 21–9 (12–6 Pac-10), and received an at-large bid to the NCAA tournament. As No. 10 seed in the Southeast region, the Beavers were beaten by No. 7 seed Notre Dame, 79–70, in a game that was played on the home floor of the Fighting Irish.

Roster

Schedule and results

|-
!colspan=9 style=| Regular Season

|-
!colspan=9 style=| NCAA Tournament

Rankings

NBA Draft

References 

Oregon State Beavers men's basketball seasons
Oregon State
Oregon State
NCAA
NCAA